The 2019 Milan–San Remo was the 110th edition of the Milan–San Remo one-day Italian road cycling race that took place on 23 March 2019.  It was the eighth event of the 2019 UCI World Tour, and was the first Monument of the year.  The race was won in the sprint by Julian Alaphilippe before Oliver Naesen and the winner of the 2017 race  Michał Kwiatkowski.

Result

References

External links

Milan-San Remo
Milan-San Remo
Milan-San Remo
Milan–San Remo
2019 in road cycling